John Charles Walker (July 6, 1893 – November 25, 1994) was an American agricultural scientist noted for his research of plant disease resistance.
The New York Times said that Walker's "pioneering research in disease resistance in plants had a strong impact on world agriculture" and that Walker "was the first scientist to demonstrate the chemical nature of disease resistance in plants".
Walker is most known for developing disease-resistant varieties of onions, cabbages, beans, peas, beets and cucumbers.
The National Academy of Sciences said that he was considered "one of the world's greatest plant pathologists" and that "his fundamental discoveries of plant disease resistance made a lasting impact on world agriculture".
Walker was professor emeritus at the University of Wisconsin–Madison.
He was also president and a fellow of The American Phytopathological Society and received the APS Award of Distinction.

Distinctions 
 1945: elected to the National Academy of Sciences
 1960: an honorary doctor of science, University of Göttingen in Germany
 1963: the Merit Award, the Botanical Society of America
 1965: a fellow, the American Phytopathological Society
 1970: Award of Distinction, the American Phytopathological Society
 1972: E. C. Stakeman Award, The University of Minnesota
 1978: the $50,000 Wolf Foundation Prize in Agriculture in Israel

Chronology 
 July 6, 1893: born in Racine, Wisconsin
 1914: B.S., the University of Wisconsin–Madison
 1915: M.S., the University of Wisconsin–Madison
 1918: Ph.D., the University of Wisconsin–Madison
 November 25, 1994: died Boswell Memorial Hospital in Sun City, Arizona

References 

1893 births
1994 deaths
American centenarians
Men centenarians
American phytopathologists
University of Wisconsin–Madison College of Agricultural and Life Sciences alumni
University of Wisconsin–Madison faculty
Members of the United States National Academy of Sciences
Wolf Prize in Agriculture laureates
People from Racine, Wisconsin
American agriculturalists
20th-century agronomists